The Atrasado Formation is a geologic formation in New Mexico. Its fossil assemblage dates the formation to the Kasimovian age of the Pennsylvanian. It was formerly known locally as the Wild Cow Formation or the Guadelupe Box Formation.

Description
The formation consists primarily of marine limestone with some sandstone and shale. It is exposed in the Sandia Mountains, the Lucero Uplift, the western Jemez Mountains, and in the Manzano Mountains.

The formation has been  mapped as the Wild Cow Formation in the Manzano Mountains and as the Guadelupe Box Formation in the Jemez Mountains. However, Spencer G. Lucas and coinvestigators have recommended abandoning the name Wild Cow Formation and using Atrasado Formation throughout the Madera Group. The formation is likely correlative with the Alamitos Formation in the Sangre de Cristo Mountains.

The formation is underlain by the Gray Mesa Formation, with its base defined by a sandstone interval atop an eroded limestone surface of the Gray Mesa Formation. It is further distinguished from the Gray Mesa Formation in having frequent intervals of slope-forming sandstone or shale beds between cliff-forming limestone intervals, whereas the Gray Mesa Formation is mostly massive limestone. The Atrasado Formation is overlain by the Bursum Formation or by the Abo Formation where the Bursum Formation is not present.

The formation is divided into eight members.

The lowest few meters of the Bartolo Member is often a distinctive pebbly sandstone, the Coyote Sandstone Bed.

The formation was laid down during the Ancestral Rocky Mountains orogeny, when most of New Mexico consisted of high islands surrounded by marine basins. The Burrego Member, in particular, contains both marine and continental beds, and the continental beds include paleosols (fossil soils) typical of a monsoon climate. New Mexico was then located at the western end of the Pangean tropical belt. Analysis of the paleosols suggests a carbon dioxide concentration in the atmosphere of around 400 ppm by volume at the time of deposition.

Fossils
The exposures near Jemez Springs include some of the richest brachiopod fossil beds in North America. Crinoid stems and bryozoans are also part of the fossil assemblage. The Amado Member is particularly rich in brachiopods in the Manzano Mountains.

The lower part of the Atrasado Formation (Tinajas Member) contains the index fusulinid Eowaeringella indicating the beds were laid down in the lower Missourian Age. These are overlain by beds containing abundant early Triticites.

History of investigation
The unit was first described as the Atrasado Member of the Madera Formation by Kelley and Wood in 1946.

The Pennsylvanian stratigraphy of New Mexico has historically been unusually complex and inconsistent, with dozens of names for groups, formations, and members. Barry Kues and Katherine Giles recommended that the name Madera Group be applied to similar exposures of shelf and marginal basin beds of Desmoinean (upper Moscovian) to early Virgilian age found from north-central and central New Mexico south along the west side of the Orogrande Basin as far as the Caballo and Robledo Mountains. Lucas and coinvestigators recommended abandoning the name Wild Cow Formation and using Atrasado Formation throughout the Madera Group.

See also

 List of fossiliferous stratigraphic units in New Mexico
 Paleontology in New Mexico

Footnotes

References
 
 
 
 
 
 
 

Carboniferous formations of New Mexico
Permian System of North America
Carboniferous southern paleotropical deposits
Limestone formations of the United States